Stigmella tityrella is a moth of the family Nepticulidae. It is found in all of Europe, except the European part of Russia.

The wingspan is 5–6 mm. The thick erect hairs on the head vertex are ochreous-yellowish. The collar is white. Antennal eyecaps are white. The forewings are shining bronzy-brown with a rather oblique shining golden-silvery fascia beyond middle; apical area beyond this dark bronzy-brown. Hindwings are grey; in male with an expansible pencil of blackish hairs at base of costa. 
External image
Adults are on wing from April to May and again from July to August. There are two generations per year.

The larvae feed on beech (Fagus sylvatica), mining the leaves of their host plant. The mine consists of a corridor that does not widen much and zigzags between two lateral veins in the direction of the leaf margin.

References

External links
 bladmineerders.nl
 UKmoths
 Fauna Europaea
 Swedish Moths
 Stigmella tityrella  images at Consortium for the Barcode of Life
lepiforum.de
 

Nepticulidae
Moths described in 1854
Moths of Europe
Taxa named by Henry Tibbats Stainton